John Aloysius Thivy (Tamil: ஜான் திவி)(1904–1959) was a Malayan Indian politician and former lawyer who was the founding president of the Malayan Indian Congress.

Thivy finished schooling at St. Michael's Institution in Ipoh, Perak. He studied law in London, before returning to practise in Malaya. In London, Thivy had a chance to meet Mohandas Gandhi and came to be interested in the Indian independence movement. On his return to Malaya, after getting his law degree in 1932, he became involved with the Indian nationalist movements.

Later, after the fall of Malaya to the Japanese, Thivy's interest was rekindled by a speech given by Subhas Chandra Bose at one of his rallies in 1943. Thivy joined the Indian National Army in 1943 and served in the Burma Front. He also served in a ministerial cabinet post under Bose' Provisional Government of Free India, the Azad Hind.

After the Japan's surrender, John Thivy was held at Changi prison for collaboration and was only released after India's independence.

On 4 August 1946, Thivy became the 1st and founding President of the Malayan Indian Congress (MIC), which represented Indian interests in Malaya. He was helped in the setting up of the party by other notable individuals such as Janaky Athi Nahappan. The MIC was modelled after the Indian National Congress. The party participated in the Malayan Independence movement.

In 1948, Thivy was appointed as an official to represent India in Southeast Asia by the Nehru Government.

See also
 Indian National Army
 Janaky Athi Nahappan
 Malayan Indian Congress

Notes

References
 Biographies of INA freedom Fighter National Archives of Singapore
 Times of India
 Malaysian Indian Congress. History
 Subhas Chandra Bose and the Indian National Army. Asian Journal, Radio Singapore International.
 Reference to the "late John Thivy"

Indian National Army personnel
Malaysian politicians of Indian descent
Indian revolutionaries
1904 births
1959 deaths
Presidents of Malaysian Indian Congress
Malaysian political party founders
Ambassadors of India to the Netherlands